Hide and Seek is a Swiss romantic comedy-drama film directed by Christoph Schaub. It is the first-ever Romansh language television film and made its debut at the Locarno Festival. The film was also screened at the Toronto International Film Festival before airing on Swiss national television in September 2018. Cinema Management Group purchased the international distribution rights for the film.

Plot 
In a small village in Grisons, Mona and Gieri, a middle-aged couple who have been married for twenty years, are having difficulty with their romantic relationship. They befriend Father Nanda Sharma, their village's new Catholic priest, and ask for his advice to help spice up their relationship. His unconventional ways stir up trouble in the village. Upon discovering that Gieri has had an extramarital affair, Mona leaves him. She opens a café and starts dating another man. Gieri, encouraged by their two children, tries to win her back.

Cast 
 Rebecca Indermaur as Mona
 Bruno Cathomas as Gieri
 Tonia Maria Zindel as Guilia
 Beat Marti as Urs
 Marietta Jemmi as Carla
 Murali Perumal as Father Nanda Sharma
 René Schnoz as Silvio
 Anita Iselin as Ladina
 Martin Rapold as Michael
 Muriel Degonda as Peppina
 Bono Jacomet as Leo
 Peter Jecklin as Vicar General Huber
 Roman Weishaupt as Hunter

Production and release 
Amur senza fin was directed by Christoph Schaub and co-produced by the Swiss Broadcasting Corporation's Zodiac Pictures LTD and premiered at the Festival del film Locarno in August 2018. In September 2018 it was screened at the Toronto International Film Festival. On 2 September 2018 Amur senza fin was shown at more than 20 cinemas throughout Switzerland for Cinema Day. The television premiere was broadcast on 23 September 2018 on SRF 1. It is the first Romansh language television film produced.

Cinema Management Group, a Los Angeles–based film company, bought the international distribution rights for Amur senza fin.

References 

2018 romantic comedy-drama films
2018 films
Romansh-language films
Swiss Broadcasting Corporation
Swiss romantic comedy-drama films